The 2003–04 Atlanta Thrashers season was the Thrashers' fifth season.

Off-season

Regular season

Final standings

Schedule and results

|- align="center" bgcolor="#CCFFCC" 
|1||W||October 9, 2003||2–1 || align="left"|  Columbus Blue Jackets (2003–04) ||1–0–0–0 || 
|- align="center" bgcolor="#CCFFCC" 
|2||W||October 11, 2003||4–3 || align="left"| @ Washington Capitals (2003–04) ||2–0–0–0 || 
|- align="center" 
|3||T||October 14, 2003||2–2 OT|| align="left"|  New York Islanders (2003–04) ||2–0–1–0 || 
|- align="center" 
|4||T||October 16, 2003||0–0 OT|| align="left"| @ New York Rangers (2003–04) ||2–0–2–0 || 
|- align="center" bgcolor="#CCFFCC" 
|5||W||October 18, 2003||7–2 || align="left"|  Chicago Blackhawks (2003–04) ||3–0–2–0 || 
|- align="center" bgcolor="#FF6F6F"
|6||OTL||October 21, 2003||2–3 OT|| align="left"| @ Tampa Bay Lightning (2003–04) ||3–0–2–1 || 
|- align="center" bgcolor="#CCFFCC" 
|7||W||October 23, 2003||4–2 || align="left"|  Nashville Predators (2003–04) ||4–0–2–1 || 
|- align="center" bgcolor="#FFBBBB"
|8||L||October 25, 2003||2–3 || align="left"|  Florida Panthers (2003–04) ||4–1–2–1 || 
|- align="center" bgcolor="#CCFFCC" 
|9||W||October 27, 2003||3–2 OT|| align="left"| @ Toronto Maple Leafs (2003–04) ||5–1–2–1 || 
|- align="center" bgcolor="#FFBBBB"
|10||L||October 30, 2003||2–3 || align="left"| @ Minnesota Wild (2003–04) ||5–2–2–1 || 
|- align="center" bgcolor="#FFBBBB"
|11||L||October 31, 2003||1–2 || align="left"| @ Washington Capitals (2003–04) ||5–3–2–1 || 
|-

|- align="center" 
|12||T||November 2, 2003||2–2 OT|| align="left"|  San Jose Sharks (2003–04) ||5–3–3–1 || 
|- align="center" bgcolor="#CCFFCC" 
|13||W||November 5, 2003||7–4 || align="left"| @ Buffalo Sabres (2003–04) ||6–3–3–1 || 
|- align="center" bgcolor="#FFBBBB"
|14||L||November 7, 2003||2–4 || align="left"| @ Columbus Blue Jackets (2003–04) ||6–4–3–1 || 
|- align="center" bgcolor="#CCFFCC" 
|15||W||November 8, 2003||4–3 || align="left"| @ New York Islanders (2003–04) ||7–4–3–1 || 
|- align="center" bgcolor="#FFBBBB"
|16||L||November 11, 2003||3–5 || align="left"|  Ottawa Senators (2003–04) ||7–5–3–1 || 
|- align="center" bgcolor="#FFBBBB"
|17||L||November 13, 2003||1–5 || align="left"| @ Carolina Hurricanes (2003–04) ||7–6–3–1 || 
|- align="center" bgcolor="#FFBBBB"
|18||L||November 15, 2003||0–4 || align="left"| @ Philadelphia Flyers (2003–04) ||7–7–3–1 || 
|- align="center" bgcolor="#CCFFCC" 
|19||W||November 16, 2003||5–2 || align="left"|  Florida Panthers (2003–04) ||8–7–3–1 || 
|- align="center" bgcolor="#CCFFCC" 
|20||W||November 19, 2003||5–4 OT|| align="left"|  Boston Bruins (2003–04) ||9–7–3–1 || 
|- align="center" bgcolor="#CCFFCC" 
|21||W||November 21, 2003||6–3 || align="left"| @ Florida Panthers (2003–04) ||10–7–3–1 || 
|- align="center" bgcolor="#CCFFCC" 
|22||W||November 23, 2003||1–0 || align="left"|  Phoenix Coyotes (2003–04) ||11–7–3–1 || 
|- align="center" bgcolor="#FFBBBB"
|23||L||November 25, 2003||3–6 || align="left"|  Ottawa Senators (2003–04) ||11–8–3–1 || 
|- align="center" bgcolor="#FFBBBB"
|24||L||November 27, 2003||1–3 || align="left"|  Toronto Maple Leafs (2003–04) ||11–9–3–1 || 
|- align="center" bgcolor="#CCFFCC" 
|25||W||November 29, 2003||2–1 || align="left"|  Tampa Bay Lightning (2003–04) ||12–9–3–1 || 
|-

|- align="center" bgcolor="#FFBBBB"
|26||L||December 1, 2003||3–4 || align="left"| @ Pittsburgh Penguins (2003–04) ||12–10–3–1 || 
|- align="center" bgcolor="#FFBBBB"
|27||L||December 3, 2003||4–6 || align="left"|  Boston Bruins (2003–04) ||12–11–3–1 || 
|- align="center" bgcolor="#CCFFCC" 
|28||W||December 5, 2003||6–2 || align="left"|  Mighty Ducks of Anaheim (2003–04) ||13–11–3–1 || 
|- align="center" bgcolor="#CCFFCC" 
|29||W||December 6, 2003||4–3 OT|| align="left"| @ Florida Panthers (2003–04) ||14–11–3–1 || 
|- align="center" bgcolor="#CCFFCC" 
|30||W||December 10, 2003||4–3 OT|| align="left"|  Los Angeles Kings (2003–04) ||15–11–3–1 || 
|- align="center" bgcolor="#CCFFCC" 
|31||W||December 12, 2003||6–3 || align="left"|  Pittsburgh Penguins (2003–04) ||16–11–3–1 || 
|- align="center" bgcolor="#FFBBBB"
|32||L||December 13, 2003||0–4 || align="left"| @ New York Islanders (2003–04) ||16–12–3–1 || 
|- align="center" bgcolor="#FFBBBB"
|33||L||December 16, 2003||0–5 || align="left"|  Washington Capitals (2003–04) ||16–13–3–1 || 
|- align="center" bgcolor="#FFBBBB"
|34||L||December 18, 2003||0–3 || align="left"|  New Jersey Devils (2003–04) ||16–14–3–1 || 
|- align="center" bgcolor="#CCFFCC" 
|35||W||December 20, 2003||7–4 || align="left"| @ Pittsburgh Penguins (2003–04) ||17–14–3–1 || 
|- align="center" bgcolor="#CCFFCC" 
|36||W||December 21, 2003||4–1 || align="left"|  Philadelphia Flyers (2003–04) ||18–14–3–1 || 
|- align="center" bgcolor="#CCFFCC" 
|37||W||December 26, 2003||3–1 || align="left"|  Tampa Bay Lightning (2003–04) ||19–14–3–1 || 
|- align="center" bgcolor="#FFBBBB"
|38||L||December 28, 2003||2–5 || align="left"| @ Ottawa Senators (2003–04) ||19–15–3–1 || 
|- align="center" bgcolor="#FFBBBB"
|39||L||December 29, 2003||1–2 || align="left"|  Montreal Canadiens (2003–04) ||19–16–3–1 || 
|- align="center" bgcolor="#FF6F6F"
|40||OTL||December 31, 2003||5–6 OT|| align="left"| @ Detroit Red Wings (2003–04) ||19–16–3–2 || 
|-

|- align="center" bgcolor="#FFBBBB"
|41||L||January 3, 2004||1–5 || align="left"| @ Montreal Canadiens (2003–04) ||19–17–3–2 || 
|- align="center" bgcolor="#FFBBBB"
|42||L||January 8, 2004||1–2 || align="left"| @ Dallas Stars (2003–04) ||19–18–3–2 || 
|- align="center" bgcolor="#FFBBBB"
|43||L||January 10, 2004||2–5 || align="left"| @ San Jose Sharks (2003–04) ||19–19–3–2 || 
|- align="center" 
|44||T||January 11, 2004||1–1 OT|| align="left"| @ Phoenix Coyotes (2003–04) ||19–19–4–2 || 
|- align="center" bgcolor="#FFBBBB"
|45||L||January 14, 2004||1–2 || align="left"|  Montreal Canadiens (2003–04) ||19–20–4–2 || 
|- align="center" bgcolor="#FFBBBB"
|46||L||January 16, 2004||3–4 || align="left"|  Carolina Hurricanes (2003–04) ||19–21–4–2 || 
|- align="center" bgcolor="#CCFFCC" 
|47||W||January 18, 2004||5–2 || align="left"| @ Carolina Hurricanes (2003–04) ||20–21–4–2 || 
|- align="center" bgcolor="#CCFFCC" 
|48||W||January 20, 2004||4–1 || align="left"|  Buffalo Sabres (2003–04) ||21–21–4–2 || 
|- align="center" 
|49||T||January 22, 2004||1–1 OT|| align="left"|  Colorado Avalanche (2003–04) ||21–21–5–2 || 
|- align="center" bgcolor="#FFBBBB"
|50||L||January 24, 2004||0–3 || align="left"|  New York Islanders (2003–04) ||21–22–5–2 || 
|- align="center" bgcolor="#FFBBBB"
|51||L||January 25, 2004||2–3 || align="left"| @ New Jersey Devils (2003–04) ||21–23–5–2 || 
|- align="center" 
|52||T||January 28, 2004||1–1 OT|| align="left"|  St. Louis Blues (2003–04) ||21–23–6–2 || 
|- align="center" bgcolor="#FFBBBB"
|53||L||January 30, 2004||1–4 || align="left"|  Toronto Maple Leafs (2003–04) ||21–24–6–2 || 
|- align="center" bgcolor="#FFBBBB"
|54||L||January 31, 2004||2–5 || align="left"| @ Tampa Bay Lightning (2003–04) ||21–25–6–2 || 
|-

|- align="center" bgcolor="#FFBBBB"
|55||L||February 3, 2004||4–5 || align="left"| @ Boston Bruins (2003–04) ||21–26–6–2 || 
|- align="center" bgcolor="#FFBBBB"
|56||L||February 5, 2004||1–5 || align="left"|  Philadelphia Flyers (2003–04) ||21–27–6–2 || 
|- align="center" bgcolor="#FFBBBB"
|57||L||February 10, 2004||2–5 || align="left"| @ Calgary Flames (2003–04) ||21–28–6–2 || 
|- align="center" bgcolor="#FFBBBB"
|58||L||February 11, 2004||1–5 || align="left"| @ Edmonton Oilers (2003–04) ||21–29–6–2 || 
|- align="center" bgcolor="#CCFFCC" 
|59||W||February 13, 2004||4–1 || align="left"| @ Vancouver Canucks (2003–04) ||22–29–6–2 || 
|- align="center" bgcolor="#FFBBBB"
|60||L||February 16, 2004||2–7 || align="left"| @ Buffalo Sabres (2003–04) ||22–30–6–2 || 
|- align="center" bgcolor="#CCFFCC" 
|61||W||February 17, 2004||4–1 || align="left"| @ Montreal Canadiens (2003–04) ||23–30–6–2 || 
|- align="center" bgcolor="#CCFFCC" 
|62||W||February 19, 2004||3–2 OT|| align="left"| @ Ottawa Senators (2003–04) ||24–30–6–2 || 
|- align="center" bgcolor="#FFBBBB"
|63||L||February 21, 2004||4–5 || align="left"| @ Philadelphia Flyers (2003–04) ||24–31–6–2 || 
|- align="center" bgcolor="#FFBBBB"
|64||L||February 25, 2004||2–4 || align="left"|  Tampa Bay Lightning (2003–04) ||24–32–6–2 || 
|- align="center" bgcolor="#CCFFCC" 
|65||W||February 27, 2004||3–2 || align="left"| @ New Jersey Devils (2003–04) ||25–32–6–2 || 
|- align="center" bgcolor="#CCFFCC" 
|66||W||February 29, 2004||3–2 || align="left"|  New York Rangers (2003–04) ||26–32–6–2 || 
|-

|- align="center" bgcolor="#CCFFCC" 
|67||W||March 2, 2004||4–3 || align="left"| @ New York Rangers (2003–04) ||27–32–6–2 || 
|- align="center" bgcolor="#FF6F6F"
|68||OTL||March 5, 2004||2–3 OT|| align="left"|  Carolina Hurricanes (2003–04) ||27–32–6–3 || 
|- align="center" 
|69||T||March 6, 2004||2–2 OT|| align="left"| @ Boston Bruins (2003–04) ||27–32–7–3 || 
|- align="center" bgcolor="#FFBBBB"
|70||L||March 9, 2004||0–2 || align="left"|  New York Rangers (2003–04) ||27–33–7–3 || 
|- align="center" bgcolor="#FFBBBB"
|71||L||March 12, 2004||2–4 || align="left"| @ Carolina Hurricanes (2003–04) ||27–34–7–3 || 
|- align="center" bgcolor="#CCFFCC" 
|72||W||March 13, 2004||5–2 || align="left"|  Washington Capitals (2003–04) ||28–34–7–3 || 
|- align="center" bgcolor="#CCFFCC" 
|73||W||March 15, 2004||1–0 OT|| align="left"|  Carolina Hurricanes (2003–04) ||29–34–7–3 || 
|- align="center" bgcolor="#FF6F6F"
|74||OTL||March 17, 2004||3–4 OT|| align="left"|  Buffalo Sabres (2003–04) ||29–34–7–4 || 
|- align="center" bgcolor="#CCFFCC" 
|75||W||March 19, 2004||3–2 || align="left"|  Florida Panthers (2003–04) ||30–34–7–4 || 
|- align="center" 
|76||T||March 20, 2004||2–2 OT|| align="left"| @ Washington Capitals (2003–04) ||30–34–8–4 || 
|- align="center" bgcolor="#CCFFCC" 
|77||W||March 24, 2004||3–2 || align="left"|  Washington Capitals (2003–04) ||31–34–8–4 || 
|- align="center" bgcolor="#FFBBBB"
|78||L||March 26, 2004||0–5 || align="left"|  New Jersey Devils (2003–04) ||31–35–8–4 || 
|- align="center" bgcolor="#CCFFCC" 
|79||W||March 27, 2004||3–0 || align="left"| @ Florida Panthers (2003–04) ||32–35–8–4 || 
|- align="center" bgcolor="#FFBBBB"
|80||L||March 29, 2004||2–4 || align="left"| @ Toronto Maple Leafs (2003–04) ||32–36–8–4 || 
|-

|- align="center" bgcolor="#FFBBBB"
|81||L||April 2, 2004||2–3 || align="left"|  Pittsburgh Penguins (2003–04) ||32–37–8–4 || 
|- align="center" bgcolor="#CCFFCC" 
|82||W||April 3, 2004||2–1 || align="left"| @ Tampa Bay Lightning (2003–04) ||33–37–8–4 || 
|-

|-
| Legend:

Player statistics

Scoring
 Position abbreviations: C = Center; D = Defense; G = Goaltender; LW = Left Wing; RW = Right Wing
  = Joined team via a transaction (e.g., trade, waivers, signing) during the season. Stats reflect time with the Thrashers only.
  = Left team via a transaction (e.g., trade, waivers, release) during the season. Stats reflect time with the Thrashers only.

Goaltending

Awards and records

Awards

Transactions
The Thrashers were involved in the following transactions from June 10, 2003, the day after the deciding game of the 2003 Stanley Cup Finals, through June 7, 2004, the day of the deciding game of the 2004 Stanley Cup Finals.

Trades

Players acquired

Players lost

Signings

Draft picks
Atlanta's draft picks at the 2003 NHL Entry Draft held at the Gaylord Entertainment Center in Nashville, Tennessee.

Notes

References

 
 

Atlanta
Atlanta
Atlanta Thrashers seasons
Atlanta Thrashers
Atlanta Thrashers